The country mouse (Pseudomys patrius) also known as the pebble-mound mouse  or eastern pebble mound mouse 
is a species of rodent in the family Muridae. It lives only in Australia, where it is considered rare. It was described by Thomas and Dollman in 1909.

Like other pebble-mound mice, it is known for building shallow burrows with mounds of pebbles surrounding the entrances. This function is understood to be protective and collects dew. In Queensland the observed mounds in coastal areas are smaller than in drier habitats, reflecting the need to collect more of the scarcer water. The mouse lines the tunnel walls with pebbles for insulation and protection. It plugs smaller openings to the burrow system with a pebble, camouflaging the entrance, and unplugs it to exit in times of danger.

References

Pseudomys
Mammals described in 1909
Taxa named by Oldfield Thomas
Mammals of Queensland
Taxonomy articles created by Polbot